Indian Head-Milestone is a provincial electoral district for the Legislative Assembly of Saskatchewan, Canada. Located in southern Saskatchewan, this riding was created through the Representation Act, 1994 (Saskatchewan) by combining the riding of Indian Head-Wolseley with part of the riding of Bengough-Milestone. With the final report of the 2022 boundary commission, the riding will be eliminated at the next general election, with the bulk of its population going to the new riding of White City-Qu'appelle.

Communities in the district include the towns of Balgonie, Indian Head, Pilot Butte, Milestone, Rouleau, and Fort Qu'Appelle; and the villages of Edenwold, Odessa, Vibank, Avonlea, and Wilcox.

Members of the Legislative Assembly

Election results

|-

 
|NDP
|Richard Klyne
|align="right"|1,516
|align="right"|20.02
|align="right"|-7.49

|- bgcolor="white"
!align="left" colspan=3|Total
!align="right"|7,571
!align="right"|100.00
!align="right"|

|-

 
|NDP
|Corinne Pauliuk
|align="right"|2,301
|align="right"|27.51
|align="right"|-11.92

|- bgcolor="white"
!align="left" colspan=3|Total
!align="right"|8,365
!align="right"|100.00
!align="right"|

|-

 
|NDP
|Lorne Scott
|align="right"|3,258
|align="right"|39.43
|align="right"|+10.84

|- bgcolor="white"
!align="left" colspan=3|Total
!align="right"|8,263
!align="right"|100.00
!align="right"|

|-

 
|NDP
|Lorne Scott
|align="right"|2,305
|align="right"|28.59
|align="right"|-14.86

|- bgcolor="white"
!align="left" colspan=3|Total
!align="right"|8,062
!align="right"|100.00
!align="right"|

|-
 
| style="width: 130px" |NDP
|Lorne Scott
|align="right"|3,440
|align="right"|43.45
|align="right"|–

 
|Prog. Conservative
|Dale Paslawski
|align="right"|1,396
|align="right"|17.63
|align="right"|–
|- bgcolor="white"
!align="left" colspan=3|Total
!align="right"|7,917
!align="right"|100.00
!align="right"|

References

External links 
Website of the Legislative Assembly of Saskatchewan

Saskatchewan provincial electoral districts